Guabonito is a ring of bright features on Saturn's moon Titan. Currently, the feature is thought to be a partially buried impact crater, with the bright features representing the crater's rim.

History
Guabonito was first seen in Cassini images taken in October 2004 and has been observed several times since.    

Guabonito was observed by the Cassini radar instrument's synthetic aperture radar imaging mode on April 30, 2006.

Location

Namesake
This feature is named after Guabonito, the Taíno Indian sea goddess who taught the use of amulets.

References

External links
 

Impact craters on Saturn's moons
Surface features of Titan (moon)